Paul Garner is an American vaudeville actor

Paul Garner may also refer to:

 Paul Garner (comedian), British comedy writer and performer
 Paul Garner (doctor), British epidemiologist
 Paul Garner (footballer), English footballer

See also
 Paul Gardner (disambiguation)